Sarajärvi is a Finnish surname. Notable people with the surname include:

 Jani Sarajärvi (born 1979), Finnish footballer and manager
 Jesse Sarajärvi (born 1995), Finnish footballer

Finnish-language surnames